A Guide to Second Date Sex is a 2019 British romantic comedy film directed by Rachel Hirons, starring Alexandra Roach and George MacKay. The film is based on the play of the same name by Rachel Hirons.

Plot
A chance meeting at a nightclub brings together a nervous Laura and an awkward Ryan. The characters agree to go on a second date. And when the meeting time approaches, each of the young people begins to get nervous. They have little to no experience in romantic relationships. Sophisticated friends are taken to prepare them for the meeting. How bad can a second date end up being and what can you lose on it? Ryan and Laura will soon find out!

Cast 
 George MacKay as Ryan
 Alexandra Roach as Laura
 Michael Socha as Dan
 Naomi Willow as vlogger
 Gillian Elisa as Val
 Emma Rigby as Tufts
 Holly Dempsey as Bianca
 Kae Alexander as Tali
 Tom Bell as Adam
 Louise Breckon-Richards  as therapist

Reception
The film received mostly poor reviews from film critics. It has a 50% positive review score on Rotten Tomatoes based on 10 reviews. Sandra Hall of The Sydney Morning Herald gave the film 3 out of 4 stars.

References

External links

 Now Available to Stream or Buy — A Guide to Second Date Sex
 Konstantin Kitsenyuk. A very dreary date that hit the big screen

2019 films
British romantic comedy films
British sex comedy films
British films based on plays
2019 romantic comedy films
2019 directorial debut films
2010s English-language films
2010s British films